Art Atwood (December 27, 1973 – September 11, 2011) was an American IFBB professional heavyweight bodybuilder.

Career
A native of Wisconsin, Atwood's first NPC (National Physique Committee) competition came in 2000, where he placed 1st place in the super-heavyweight class of the Junior USA. His professional bodybuilding debut was the 2001 Toronto Pro where he took 1st place.  His first IFBB Mr. Olympia came in 2002, where he placed 12th. After other various competitions he competed in the IFBB Night of Champions tournament of 2003, where he placed 7th. His first Arnold Classic was in 2005, where he placed 14th.

Atwood has been featured in many fitness and bodybuilding magazines, as well as appearing on the cover of RxMuscle magazine.

Contest history 
 2000 NPC Junior USA, Super-HeavyWeight, 1st and Overall
 2000 NPC Nationals, Super-HeavyWeight, 14th
 2000 NPC USA Championships, Super-HeavyWeight, 7th
 2001 NPC Nationals, Super-HeavyWeight, 1st
 2001 NPC USA Championships, Super-HeavyWeight, 3rd
 2002 Grand Prix England, 7th
 2002 Mr. Olympia, 12th
 2002 Show of Strength Pro Championship, 12th
 2002 Toronto Pro Invitational, 1st
 2003 Grand Prix England, 7th
 2003 Grand Prix Holland, 8th
 2003 Grand Prix Hungary, 3rd
 2003 Grand Prix Russia, 6th
 2003 Night of Champions, 7th
 2003 Mr. Olympia, 13th
 2004 Florida Pro Xtreme Challenge, 5th
2004 Hungarian Pro Invitational, 8th
2004 Night of Champions, 9th
2004 Toronto Pro Invitational, 5th
2005 Arnold Classic, 14th
2005 San Francisco Pro Invitational, 10th
2006 Europa Super Show, 5th
2006 Montreal Pro, 7th
2006 Atlantic City Pro, 10th

Death
On Sunday, September 11, 2011, at about 2:30pm, Atwood was walking through the pool area of the condominium complex where he lived in Dallas, TX when he had a heart attack. Two residents who were at the pool saw him fall in and immediately pulled him out. They were able to revive him and call paramedics, but Atwood died at nearby Baylor Regional Medical Center Hospital in Plano, TX, at age 37 years. The coroner's report showed that Atwood died of a massive heart attack. The report also states Atwood unknowingly suffered a minor heart attack about a month previous. Funeral arrangements were made for Atwood, September 19, 2011, at the Krause Funeral Home, New Berlin, Wisconsin, with burial September 20, 2011, at Pinelawn Memorial Park, Wauwatosa, WI.  A vigil was held in Dallas, TX on September 16, 2011.  Atwood is survived by parents Arthur Dale Atwood, Jr. and Sandra J. (Ralph) Puffpaff; and his siblings Todd Morris (Deri), Jory (Michael) Banda, Marni Reibert, Dana Atwood (Tim) and Gina (Peter) Van Opens.

References 
Massresults.com. Bio of Art Atwood. Accessed 11/3/2006. https://web.archive.org/web/20060111114129/http://www.massresults.com/artatwood/bio/index.asp

External links 
BodyBuilder Webmagazin entry
Art Atwood Bodybuilding Gallery
Muscle Gossip #33- RIP Art Atwood

See also 
List of male professional bodybuilders
List of female professional bodybuilders

1973 births
2011 deaths
Professional bodybuilders
American bodybuilders